Margith Johanne Munkebye (15 October 1911 – 28 November 2000) was a Norwegian politician for the Labour Party.

She was born in Bodø.

She was elected to the Norwegian Parliament from Nordland in 1958, and was re-elected on three occasions. She had previously been a deputy representative in the periods 1954–1957. During part of this term she served as a regular representative meanwhile Kolbjørn Sigurd Verner Varmann was appointed to the Cabinet.

Munkebye was a member of Bodø city council in the period 1951–1955.

References

1911 births
2000 deaths
Labour Party (Norway) politicians
Members of the Storting
Women members of the Storting
Politicians from Bodø
20th-century Norwegian women politicians
20th-century Norwegian politicians